Gregory Joseph Golson (born September 17, 1985) is an American former professional baseball outfielder. A first round selection (21st overall) in the 2004 Major League Baseball draft by the Philadelphia Phillies, Golson played in Major League Baseball (MLB) for the Phillies (2008), Texas Rangers (2009), and New York Yankees (2010–2011).

Professional career

Philadelphia Phillies
Golson attended John B. Connally High School in Austin, Texas. The Philadelphia Phillies selected Golson from high school with the 21st overall pick in the first round of the 2004 Major League Baseball Draft. After drafting him, the Phillies assigned Golson to their Gulf Coast League affiliate in the rookie leagues. He played in 47 games, accumulating a .295 batting average with eight doubles and five triples. He stole 12 bases, and struck out 54 times in 183 at-bats.

Golson's speed became a feature of his game, and went on to steal over 100 bases in five minor-league seasons. In a 2008 interview, Golson said, regarding his success as a base-stealer, that "[you've] got to be real observant of what the pitcher is doing, if they fall into patterns, what the catcher is doing, the counts, the game situation—stuff like that ... but speed is the big thing".

In his second minor-league season, Golson was promoted to the A-level Lakewood BlueClaws in Lakewood, New Jersey. He continued to accumulate high strikeout numbers, with 106 in 375 at-bats, but he also posted a .264 average, hit 8 triples (a career-high), and stole 25 bases. After the 2005 season, Golson was named the second-best prospect in the Phillies' system by Baseball America, the highest spot he would reach in those rankings. Most of the 2006 season was spent at Lakewood as well, with a late-season promotion to the Clearwater Threshers. Between the two levels, Golson hit .233 and struck out 160 times. He hit 13 home runs and batted in 48 runs. Golson also accumulated 127 hits in 593 plate appearances.

Strikeouts continued to plague Golson as he began the 2007 season. Between Clearwater and the Reading Phillies, Golson struck out 173 times in 607 plate appearances. He hit 15 home runs in 2007, with 32 doubles and 5 triples. His .273 average and .426 slugging percentage were a large improvement over the previous year. His prospect ranking dropped from second in the Phillies' system to tenth.

Golson remained at Reading for the 2008 season. A .282 average, 13 home runs, and 18 doubles were enough to catch the eye of the major league club, who called him up to the majors on August 31. He made his debut on September 7, pinch-hitting for catcher Carlos Ruiz. He made several appearances as a late-inning defensive replacement, which was fine with Golson. "You can really impact a game, where people will remember stuff … if you make a great catch that saves the game, people remember that for a long time." With the Phillies, Golson went 0-for-6 in the last month of the 2008 season, scoring two runs and stealing a base. Golson was not part of the postseason roster for the 2008 Phillies, who went on to win the World Series, but he did travel with the team and was in uniform for all the club's playoff games.

Texas Rangers
On November 20, 2008, Golson was traded by the Phillies to the Texas Rangers for John Mayberry, Jr. Phillies general manager Rubén Amaro, Jr. called the trade a speed-for-power' swap".
Golson received one at-bat for the Rangers in 2009, spending most of his season at the AAA level with the Oklahoma RedHawks. In 146 plate appearances, Golson accumulated a .289 average with five doubles and three triples. He also stole six bases and scored fourteen runs in the opening two months.

New York Yankees
On January 26, 2010, Golson was traded to the New York Yankees in exchange for minor league player Mitch Hilligoss and cash, after being designated for assignment by the Texas Rangers a few days earlier. Golson was used as primarily a defensive replacement. On September 14 against the Tampa Bay Rays at Tropicana Field, Golson astonished players and spectators with a strong throw when threw out the speedy Carl Crawford in an attempt to reach third base after tagging up for the final out of the game. Golson would later be included on the Yankees' 2010 postseason roster until the team lost the 2010 ALCS to the Texas Rangers.  He spent most of the 2011 season with the Yankees' AAA affiliate, the Scranton/Wilkes-Barre Yankees. He was released prior to the Rule 5 draft that offseason.

Minor Leagues
The Kansas City Royals signed Golson to a minor league contract on December 13, 2011. The Royals traded Golson to the Chicago White Sox for cash considerations on March 25, 2012. Golson played in 2012 with Triple-A Charlotte, where in 109 games, he hit .276 with 6 HR, 52 RBI and 20 SB.
The Colorado Rockies signed Golson to a minor league contract on January 30, 2013. Golson began 2013 with Triple-A Colorado Springs. He played there until he was released on July 19. In 55 games with the Sky Sox, Golson hit .244 with 5 HR, 22 RBI and 12 SB.
Golson was signed to a minor league contract for the Atlanta Braves on July 31, 2013.
Golson signed a minor league contract for the Milwaukee Brewers in January 2014. He was released in March and signed with the Lancaster Barnstormers, he appeared in 51 games for the Barnstormers before moving to the Mexican League and playing in 134 games over the 2014 and 2015 seasons. Golson returned to the Atlantic League after he signed a 1-year deal with the New Britain Bees on March 18, 2016 

Golson re-signed with the New Britain Bees for the 2017 season but shortly after asked for his release and on April 10, 2017, Golson signed with the Tigres de Quintana Roo of the Mexican Baseball League. He was released on May 5, 2017.

On May 26, 2017, Golson signed with the Somerset Patriots of the Atlantic League of Professional Baseball. He became a free agent following the season.

On March 9, 2018, Golson signed with the Wichita Wingnuts of the American Association. He was traded to the Texas AirHogs on March 28, 2018. He was released on March 5, 2019.

On May 27, 2019, Golson signed with the Lancaster Barnstormers of the Atlantic League of Professional Baseball. He became a free agent following the season.

Golson retired following the 2019 season and later was hired by the Los Angeles Dodgers in their pro scouting department.

References

External links

1985 births
Living people
African-American baseball players
American expatriate baseball players in Mexico
Baseball players from Austin, Texas
Charlotte Knights players
Clearwater Threshers players
Colorado Springs Sky Sox players
Florida Complex League Phillies players
Gwinnett Braves players
Lakewood BlueClaws players
Lancaster Barnstormers players
Major League Baseball outfielders
Mexican League baseball center fielders
Mexican League baseball right fielders
Mississippi Braves players
New Britain Bees players
New York Yankees players
Oklahoma City RedHawks players
Philadelphia Phillies players
Reading Phillies players
Scranton/Wilkes-Barre Yankees players
Somerset Patriots players
Texas AirHogs players
Texas Rangers players
Tigres de Quintana Roo players
21st-century African-American sportspeople
20th-century African-American people